Simeon Oluwatimelehin Akinola Olaonipekun (born 6 August 1992) is a Nigerian footballer who plays for Wealdstone.

Career
Born in Lagos, Nigeria, Akinola moved to Madrid aged three. He started playing futsal aged nine before joining Alcorcón after a successful trial, later moving to London.

He joined the academy at Boreham Wood, and made his senior debut in January 2011, a season in which he scored 53 goals for the reserve team. He was loaned out to Billericay Town in November 2011, and then Harrow Borough in February 2012, before signing for Borough permanently for a fee of £2,400, set by tribunal after Boreham Wood rejected an initial offer of £750.

In August 2014, Akinola joined Braintree Town for an undisclosed fee.

He joined Barnet on 1 January 2017 for a fee of £40,000. He made his debut the following day against Plymouth Argyle

On 31 August 2017 - transfer deadline day - Barnet agreed terms with Lincoln City for the transfer of Akinola, pending verification from the EFL. On 5 September it was confirmed that the EFL had refused to ratify the transfer and that Akinola would remain at Barnet. He left the club at the end of the 2019-20 season, having scored 24 goals in 106 games.

On 17 September 2020, Akinola signed for Southend United on a two-year deal with an option for a third. In November 2020 it was reported that Akinola's debut for the Shrimpers was being held up by an embargo on player registrations against the club.

Akinola made his Southend United debut on 12 December 2020, starting in a 1–0 win at Roots Hall over Scunthorpe United.

On 8 October 2022, Akinola signed for National League side Wealdstone. He scored his first goal for the club on the same day, scoring in his first appearance from the bench, in a 2–1 defeat to Boreham Wood.

International career
Akinola is eligible to play for Nigeria and Spain at international level. He was called up by England C in May 2015, but was forced to withdraw.

Personal life
Akinola has a degree in systems engineering.

Career statistics

References

External links

1992 births
Living people
Nigerian footballers
Spanish footballers
Nigerian emigrants to Spain
Naturalised citizens of Spain
Spanish sportspeople of African descent
Spanish people of Nigerian descent
Sportspeople of Nigerian descent
Association football forwards
AD Alcorcón footballers
Boreham Wood F.C. players
Billericay Town F.C. players
Harrow Borough F.C. players
Braintree Town F.C. players
Barnet F.C. players
Southend United F.C. players
English Football League players
National League (English football) players
Isthmian League players